Fanouropita is a sweet cake recipe from Greek cuisine and is traditionally a Lenten cake, also called "The lost and found cake." It is traditionally served in St. Fanourios' Feast Day on August 27, given to Greek Orthodox believers as a blessing.

Fanouropita is oil-based and does not contain any butter or eggs so that it can be eaten on holy fasting days. Believers offer the cake expecting "revelations" on objects, people, or to find something they are looking for.

Greece is known for its many traditions, but one custom which primarily stands out is in memory of Saint Fanourios. The most celebrated patron saint of lost things is commemorated by baking a cake.

Etymology 

The name Fanouropita is derived from the patron saint of Rhodes, Saint Phanourios. His name translates in Greek as "the one who discloses." (Greek verb: "φαίνω").
He is the saint of "lost things".

Origin 

The tradition of Fanouropita originated around 1500 AD, or 1355-1369 AD, to venerate the icon of Saint Fanourios when he was discovered untouched between ruins in Rhodes or Cyprus. In local Orthodox tradition, Saint Fanourios has been since known as the patron Saint of lost objects. When a lost object is revealed or found, followers of Saint Fanourios have often baked Propitiation in memory of his mother. His mother was known as a cruel sinner, sent to hell because of her shameful life. Fanourios prayed that her soul would be saved, begging God for her salvation.

Description 

Fanouropita is usually 25-30 cm diameter. It is puffy, oily, aromatic, and sometimes powdered with sifted white sugar.

Ingredients 

Fanouropita traditionally consists of seven, nine, or eleven ingredients, the number varying by region. In its simplest version, propitiation has only seven ingredients. The essential, most common ingredients are: flour, vegetable oil, sugar, orange juice, baking powder, nuts, and raisins. Other ingredients may include cinnamon, cloves, soda, and water.

Preparation 

Solid and liquid ingredients are mixed separately from one another. Afterwards, the two mixes are combined in a round baking pan, which goes into the oven at about 170-180°C for about an hour. Once out of the oven it is left to cool down and then powdered with sifted sugar.

Tradition 

Fanouropita is blessed in church and its pieces are offered to people. According to tradition, it is offered for the forgiveness of the Saint Fanourios' mother, a sinful woman who was cruel towards the poor.

In popular culture 

In various areas of Greece and Cyprus, the tradition is followed by Orthodox Christians asking Saint Fanourios to "reveal" a job to the unemployed, to salvage an item that was lost, or to give health and find a groom for unmarried girls.

See also 
 Vasilopita

 List of pies

References 

Greek cakes